Claude Debussy's Reflets dans l'eau ("Reflections in the Water") is the first of three piano pieces from his first volume of Images, which are frequently performed separately. It was written in 1905. As with much of Debussy's work, it is referred to as Impressionistic, meaning that it expresses emotions and senses by making use of non-functional harmony and ambiguous key signatures, its tonality being mainly non-diatonic and usually having a sense of modality.

Musical analysis
Reflets dans l'eau opens in a slow tempo (andantino molto) (which is repeated through much of the piece) while the right hand is playing a set of chords to accompany the melody. It shares the main characteristics of French music of this period, similar to works by Ravel such as Jeux d'eau.

The piece has several brief melody statements and climaxes that are more glimpses of music than full ideas, which is typical of Debussy's middle and late piano works. Writing "images", Debussy was purposely intending not to create linear musical progression, but a sonic representation of water. Reflets dans l'eau is also an example of the new tone colors Debussy discovered for the piano in this part of his life, and although he later refined this style, it is representative of a major breakthrough in piano writing.

Performance 
Between 1968 and 1974 it was conducted and recorded by Pierre Boulez who give the whole trilogie a better perspective in listening. About Boulez

See also
List of compositions by Claude Debussy by genre

Notes

External links
 
 PDF copy of Reflets dans l'eau on Free-scores.com
 Reflets dans L'eau Ampico piano roll version, recorded in 1916 by Leo Ornstein and again in 2009 on a 1925 Mason & Hamlin Ampico RBB using an original Ampico roll.

French music
Compositions for solo piano
Compositions by Claude Debussy
1905 compositions